The chestnut-fronted macaw or severe macaw (Ara severus) is one of the largest of the mini-macaws.

They can be found over a large part of Northern South America from Panama south into Amazonian Brazil and central Bolivia. A feral population is found in Florida.

Their lifespan is listed as anything from 30 to 80 years of age.

Taxonomy
The chestnut-fronted macaw was formally described in 1758 by the Swedish naturalist Carl Linnaeus in the tenth edition of his Systema Naturae. He placed it with all the other parrots in the genus Psittacus and coined the binomial name Psittacus severus. This macaw is now one of the eight extant species placed the genus Ara that was erected in 1799 by the French naturalist Bernard Germain de Lacépède. The genus name is from ará meaning "macaw" in the Tupi language of Brazil. The word is an onomatopoeia based on the sound of their call. The specific epithet severus is Latin meaning "grim", "cruel" or "stern". The species is considered to be monotypic: no subspecies are recognised.

Description
The chestnut-fronted or severe macaw is mostly green in colour with patches of red and blue on the wings. The head has a chestnut brown patch just above the beak. The beak is black and the patches around the eyes are white with lines of small black feathers. It is the only one of the miniature macaws that has lines of feathers in the bare patches around its eyes. In the wild their typically gregarious personality can become more aggressive at puberty giving them the name Severe. This tendency can be curbed in captivity but the species requires significant handling to make a tame pet.

Breeding
The chestnut-fronted macaw nest in a hole in a tree. The eggs are white and there are usually two or three in a clutch. The female incubates the eggs for about 28 days, and the chicks fledge from the nest about 70 days after hatching.

Gallery

References

External links
Severe macaw in PETCO Animal Care Sheets

Severe Macaw at Animal-World
Chestnut-fronted Macaw photo gallery at Visual Resources for Ornithology
Chestnut-fronted Macaw videos in the Internet Bird Collection
Stamps (for Bolivia, Ecuador, Guyana, Panama, Peru, Suriname) with (inaccurate)-RangeMap
Chestnut-fronted Macaw - Wild Perched Pair (medium res photo) and Article - "Amazonia Lodge" at Pinkmoose Birding
Chestnut-fronted Macaw (high res photo) at Bird Watcher's Digest

Chestnut-fronted Macaw (Ara severus) - Species Factsheet at BirdLife International

chestnut-fronted macaw
chestnut-fronted macaw
Birds of Colombia
Birds of Venezuela
Birds of Ecuador
Birds of the Amazon Basin
Birds of the Guianas
chestnut-fronted macaw
chestnut-fronted macaw
Birds of Brazil